Cheonggukjang is a traditional Korean food made by fermenting soybeans. It contains whole, as well as ground soybeans.

Production 
It can be made in two to three days through fermentation of boiled soybeans, adding Bacillus subtilis, which is usually contained in the air or in the rice straw, at about 40°C without adding salt, compared with the much longer fermentation period required for doenjang, another, less pungent variety of Korean soybean paste. Like many forms of doenjang, cheonggukjang is paste-like in texture, but also includes some whole, uncrushed soybeans.

Cheonggukjang may also be made by fermenting boiled soybeans in a warm place, pounding a portion of them, and adding salt and red chili powder.

Food culture 
 is most often used to prepare a stew, which is also simply called , but may be called  to avoid confusion.  often includes additional ingredients, such as potatoes, onions, and tofu.

History and controversies 
There is no known historical source of where cheonggukjang originated from. One theory proposed by Chinese scholars is that cheonggukjang was introduced by what is now China to the Korean peninsula during the Joseon era.

However, Samkukjiwijidongijeon (Records of the Three Kingdoms, 三國志魏志東夷傳) suggests that cheonggukjang has existed in the Korean peninsula since before the Joseon era, as there are records of such fermented foods dating back to first century BC, throughout the Koryo dynasty and the Kingdom of Silla.

Nutrition and health 
Cheonggukjang is generally considered to be a healthy food (particularly in the winter), as it is rich in vitamins and other nutrients, though its very strong odor is not universally enjoyed. Doenjang may be used to replace it by people who dislike the smell.

In 1993, odorless cheonggukjang was invented by Dr. Hyun Kyu Joo, a former professor at Kunkook University, who later obtained a patent in 1998 for a method for removing cheonggukjang'''s characteristic smell.Cheonggukjang is also believed to aid in digestion. For this purpose, cheonggukjang'' pills are produced in South Korea.

See also 

 
 
 
 
 
 List of fermented foods
 List of fermented soy products

References

External links 
 Cheonggukjang recipe broken connection 
 Cheonggukjang jjigae recipe broken connection 
 Cheonggukjang site (Korean)
 Cheonggukjang recipe with pictures

Korean condiments
Fermented soy-based foods
Food paste